Washington Trust Bank is an American diversified financial services holding company headquartered in Spokane, Washington. It is the oldest and largest privately held commercial bank in the Pacific Northwest, and has more than 40 financial centers and offices in Washington, Idaho and Oregon with over 1,000 employees. As of December 2014, the bank had assets in excess of $4.77 billion.

Background

Washington Trust opened in 1902 as The Washington Trust Company. Current CEO Peter F. Stanton is the fourth generation of the Stanton family to lead the bank.

The bank operates offices throughout Washington, Oregon and Idaho. The first branches in Idaho opened in 1989, while the first branch in Portland opened in 2004. Washington Trust also expanded to the Puget Sound area, opening offices in Seattle in 2000 and in Bellevue in 2004.

Services

Services offered by the bank include personal and commercial banking, home loans, private banking, wealth management and advisory services, trust services and investment services. Washington Trust has ranked first in deposits in Spokane County since 2009.

References

Banks based in Washington (state)
Companies based in Spokane, Washington
1902 establishments in Washington (state)
Banks established in 1902